CBM (formerly Christian Blind Mission) is an international Christian development organization, committed to improving the quality of life of people with disabilities in the poorest communities of the world. It is considered one of the world's oldest and largest organizations working in this field. CBM was founded in 1908 by the German pastor Ernst Jakob Christoffel, who built homes for blind children, orphans, physically disabled, and deaf persons in Turkey and Iran. Initially CBM's efforts were focused on preventing and curing blindness but now cover other causes of disability.

CBM targets the people affected by disability by supporting local partner organizations to run programs in the fields of healthcare, rehabilitation (community-based rehabilitation – CBR), education and livelihood opportunities. In 2017 the international mental health charity BasicNeeds merged into the Christian disability charity.

CBM also advocates for disability inclusion following UN guidelines in international policy-making bodies, and campaigns and raises funds through its member associations. CBM has an emergency response team to respond to conflicts and natural disasters.

CBM reached a total of 11,954,473 people in 2018. It was active in 55 countries, supported 525 projects and worked with 371 partner organizations, including disabled people's organizations, mission agencies, local churches, self-help groups and relief agencies. It has (as of 2018) 10 member associations in Europe, North America and Oceania, comprising Germany, Switzerland, Italy, Australia, New Zealand, the United Kingdom, Ireland, Kenya, South Africa, the United States and Canada. They have had support of the Canadian government. They have been given a four-out-of-four star rating by Charity Navigator.

In 2017 CBM was the joint winner (along with Sightsavers) of the 2017 António Champalimaud Vision Award (the world's largest scientific prize in the field of vision) recognizing its work in supporting blindness prevention, alleviation and rehabilitation programs in developing countries.

References

External links 
 

Christian organizations established in 1908
Non-profit organisations based in Hesse
Development charities based in Australia
International Christian organizations
International medical and health organizations
Christian organizations established in the 20th century
Disability organisations based in Germany
1908 establishments in Germany